Neo Cab is a 2019 video game developed by Chance Agency and published by Fellow Traveller. In it, players role play as Lina, a driver for Neo Cab, a vehicle for hire service. After her friend Savy mysteriously disappears, Lina investigates the disappearance while picking up passengers.

Synopsis 
The game opens with Lina moving from her hometown, Cactus Flats, to the technological metropolis Los Ojos. She has plans to live with Savy, an old friend she hasn't spoken to in years after they had a large argument. Lina briefly meets up with Savy, who says that she's having trouble at work and will meet up with her later. She also gives her a FeelGrid, a smartwatch-like device that displays a color corresponding to the emotions that the wearer is feeling. After Lina picks up passengers for a few hours, Savy texts her that she needs to be picked up right away, then disappears.

Simmering in the background is a movement to have all drivers replaced by driverless cars owned by a corporation called Capra. Lina had previously been fired by Capra after they replaced their rideshare with driverless cars. Many of the conversations she has with passengers are about a proposed law to outlaw driving after a famous ballet dancer was killed after being hit by a car.

Gameplay 
GameInformer calls Neo Cab a "visual novel mixed with survival aspects". The game is driven by the choices that the player makes when talking to passengers. Those choices and the flow of the conversation then change Lina's mood, which is displayed on the Feelgrid. The way Lina is feeling changes which dialogue options are available, and whether she is willing to pick up another passenger. Players also have to manage the car's fuel level and how much money Lina has.

Critical reception 

Destructoid and PC Gamer both pointed out that the game discussed quite a few topics during its short playthrough. Rock, Paper, Shotgun and Game Informer both found the ending underwhelming. However, most of the above critics seemed to enjoy the game overall, especially the passengers and conversations with them. Rock, Paper, Shotgun in particular wished that there was a "free play mode" where one could continue picking up passengers without worrying about the main story.

References 

2019 video games
Cyberpunk video games
Visual novels
MacOS games
Nintendo Switch games
Single-player video games
Video games developed in the United States
Video games featuring female protagonists
Windows games
Video games about taxis
Fellow Traveller games